Amer is a municipality in the comarca of la Selva in the province of Girona, Catalonia, Spain.

From 1895, Amer was linked to Girona by the narrow gauge Olot–Girona railway, which was extended to Les Planes d'Hostoles in 1900, Sant Feliu de Pallerols in 1902 and Olot in 1911. The line closed in 1969 and has since been converted into a greenway.

Villages
Amer 1.897 
Costa de Santa Brígida, la 53 
Grup Solivent, 206 
Lloret Salvatge, 3 
Palou, 24 
Sant Climent d'Amer, 35 
Sant Genís, 0 
Veïnat de la Jonquera, 21 
Veïnat del Colomer, 7 
Veïnat del Mont, 12

Notable people
Carles Puigdemont, President of the Generalitat of Catalonia who impulsed a referendum on Catalan independence on 2017, was born in Amer in 1962.

References

 Panareda Clopés, Josep Maria; Rios Calvet, Jaume; Rabella Vives, Josep Maria (1989). Guia de Catalunya, Barcelona: Caixa de Catalunya.  (Spanish).  (Catalan).

External links 

 Pàgina web de l'Ajuntament* Government data pages 

Municipalities in Selva